Zhan Xugang (born May 15, 1974 in Kaihua County, Zhejiang) is a former male Chinese weightlifter and later politician who won the 1996 and 2000 Olympic Games. He is the first Chinese weightlifter to win two consecutive Olympics.

Biography

Weightlifting career
Zhan Xugang was recruited for the Kaihua County Sports School weightlifting program at ten years of age. Due to his progress Zhan was selected for the Zhejiang provincial team in 1987, the same year he broke a national junior record. In 1993 while on the national junior team he was named "an outstanding Asian Junior weightlifter" and was selected to the senior team in January 1994. In 1996, at the Atlanta Olympic Games, Zhan Xugang won the gold medal and broke 3 World Records. In 1998, the International Weightlifting Federation implemented new weightlifting levels. Zhan Xugang entered the 77 kg class. Zhan was challenged as the levels of his competitors rose. At the Sydney Olympic Games in 2000, Zhan snatched 160 kg and ranked fourth in the competition. Despite the adverse circumstance, he was able to clean and jerk 207.5 kg, a personal record. This allowed him to total 367.5 kg and win gold. At the 2004 Games he missed all three snatch attempts in the men's 77 kg division and did not finish the competition. Afterwards he announced his retirement.

Political career
Going forward Zhan Xugang mainly engaged in sports management in Zhejiang Province as the deputy commander in charge of weightlifting, judo and taekwondo. In 2005 he became director of the sports department of the Career Technical College.

In 2008, Zhan was one of the torch bearers for the opening ceremony of the Beijing Olympics.

In the beginning of 2012, Zhan was promoted to vice president of Zhejiang sports of the Career Technical College and became the director of seven departments. In July 2015, he served as committee member for his home and was proposed to be the deputy governor of three counties.

Major results

References

External links
 
 

1974 births
Living people
Chinese male weightlifters
Olympic gold medalists for China
Olympic weightlifters of China
Olympic medalists in weightlifting
Weightlifters at the 1996 Summer Olympics
Weightlifters at the 2000 Summer Olympics
Weightlifters at the 2004 Summer Olympics
Medalists at the 1996 Summer Olympics
Medalists at the 2000 Summer Olympics
Asian Games medalists in weightlifting
Asian Games gold medalists for China
Weightlifters at the 1994 Asian Games
Weightlifters at the 1998 Asian Games
Medalists at the 1994 Asian Games
Medalists at the 1998 Asian Games
World record setters in weightlifting
People from Quzhou
Weightlifters from Zhejiang
World Weightlifting Championships medalists
20th-century Chinese people
21st-century Chinese people